Bakel may refer to:

Places
Bakel Department, Senegal
Bakel, Senegal, a town in the eastern part of Senegal, capital of the Department
Bakel, Netherlands, a village in southern part of the Netherlands
Bakel en Milheeze, a former municipality in the Dutch province of North Brabant, now part of Gemert-Bakel
 Bekal, in Kasaragod, India

People
John Bakel (born 1972), American fashion designer

See also
Gemert-Bakel, Netherlands
Kees Bakels (born 1945), Dutch conductor